Aeroporto may refer to:

 Aeroporto, Príncipe, a settlement in São Tomé and Príncipe
 Aeroporto (Lisbon Metro), a metro station in Portugal
 Aeroporto–Guarulhos (CPTM), a train station in Guarulhos, Brazil
 Aeroporto, a Porto Metro station
 , directed by Peter Costa; see List of Italian films of 1944